Khwopa Engineering College (KhEC) is situated in the culturally rich city of Bhaktapur, Nepal.  It was established as a community college to provide engineering education by the local government with a motto "Dedicated to country and people". It is Nepal 's first community-based engineering colleges and is undertaken by Bhaktapur Municipality. It is affiliated to Purbanchal University and its sister institutions, Khwopa College of Engineering (KhCE) is affiliated to Tribhuvan University, Khwopa College (KC) is affiliated to Tribhuvan University, Khwopa Secondary School (KhSS) is affiliated to NEB, Khwopa Polytechnic Institute (KPTI) is affiliated to CTEVT, Sarada Campus is affiliated to Tribhuvan University, and Sarada Secondary School is affiliated to NEB,. With a distant vision of maintaining Bhaktapur's hard-won glory, these colleges operate with an aim to produce highly skilled engineers/architects that will have blends of both indigenous and modern-day technologies.

The bachelor's degree programs in KhEC are:
  Architecture
  Civil Engineering
  Computer Engineering
  Electronics and Communication Engineering

The master's degree programs in KhEC are:
 Masters in Earthquake Engineering
 Masters in Urban Design and Conservation

On 25–28 April 2016, the college organised International Conference on Earthquake Engineering and Post-disaster Reconstruction Planning (ICEE-PDRP) to mark the April 2015 Nepal earthquake and has successfully organised the second ICEE-PDRP in 2019 April.  in Bhaktapur. The college publishes a peer reviewed journal Journal of Science of Engineering to serve the interests of professionals, academics and research organisations working in the field of science and engineering.

Khwopa Engineering College and Khwopa College of Engineering fall among the Khwopa Circle of educational institutions run by Bhaktapur Municipality. Other institutions in the circle are:
  Khwopa Polytechnic Institute affiliated to CTEVT
  Khwopa College affiliated to Tribhuvan University
  Khwopa Secondary School affiliated to Secondary Educational Board Nepal
  Sarada Campus
  Sarada Secondary School

References

Bhaktapur
Engineering universities and colleges in Nepal
2001 establishments in Nepal